This is a list of the MPs for Irish constituencies, who were elected at the 1802 United Kingdom general election, to serve as members of the 2nd UK Parliament from Ireland, or who were elected at subsequent by-elections. There were 100 seats representing Ireland in this Parliament.

This was the first United Kingdom general election, as the House of Commons of the 1st Parliament of the United was chosen from the members of the Parliament of Great Britain and the Parliament of Ireland and not by a popular election.

The 2nd United Kingdom Parliament was elected between 5 July and 28 August 1802, as at this period the exact date for the election in each constituency was fixed by the Returning Officer. The Parliament first assembled on 31 August 1802, for a maximum duration of seven years from that date. It was dissolved on 24 October 1806 (a length of four years, one month and twenty four days).

Summary of results by party (Ireland only)
The names of and votes for candidates at elections are based on Walker. Party labels are based on those used by Stooks Smith and may differ from those in other sources. Many early nineteenth century Irish MPs are not classified by party, by Stooks Smith.

In some cases, when a party label is used for the MP by Stooks Smith in a subsequent Parliament, this is noted in the Members list below.

At the dissolution of the 1st Parliament, the MPs by party (calculated as above), were 
Other (unclassified) 50, Tory 34, Whig 16: Total 100.

Note: Two Tory candidate contested and won two constituencies. Each candidacy is counted separately in the table.

General election results by constituency

Note:
 1 Incumbent re-elected

Members by constituency
The list is given in alphabetical order by constituency. The County prefixes used for county constituencies is disregarded in determining alphabetical order, but the county follows any borough or city constituency with the same name.

The name of an MP who served during the Parliament, but who was not the holder of a seat at the dissolution in 1806, is given in italics. When the date of the election is in italics, this indicates a by-election.

A member of the 1st Parliament, for the same constituency, is indicated by an * before the MPs name. A member of the 1st Parliament, for a different constituency in Ireland, is indicated by a + before the MPs name.

Supplemental note:
 a Stooks Smith (vol. III p. 240) states that there was a by-election in 1806, with Hon. Montagu James Mathew (Whig) elected in place of Viscount Mathew who had succeeded as the 2nd Earl Landaff in July. However Stooks Smith is in error: the Return of Members of Parliament (Part II p. 229) shows that no further election was held in the constituency. The History of Parliament 1790–1820 vol. II p. 685 explains that preparations for a county by-election were made in which the new Earl of Llandaff hoped to be succeeded by his brother Montague but was restricted by a Government pledge to support Hon Francis Prittie. When the by-election was overtaken by a dissolution, the Mathew family managed to get both elected by deposing John Bagwell.

References

 The Parliaments of England by Henry Stooks Smith (1st edition published in three volumes 1844–50), second edition edited (in one volume) by F. W. S. Craig (Political Reference Publications 1973)
 Parliamentary Election Results in Ireland, 1801–1922, edited by B. M. Walker (Royal Irish Academy 1978)

See also
Duration of English, British and United Kingdom parliaments from 1660
List of parliaments of the United Kingdom
List of United Kingdom by-elections (1801–1806)
1802 United Kingdom general election